Yvonne Zima (born January 16, 1989) is an American actress. She is known for her role as Daisy Carter on The Young and the Restless.

Early life
Zima was born in Phillipsburg, New Jersey, the daughter of Dennis and Marie. Her surname means "winter" in Polish and comes from her maternal grandfather, who was of Polish descent.

Career
Zima's breakthrough role was as Caitlin, the daughter of Geena Davis' character, in the film The Long Kiss Goodnight (1996). She also played Rachel Greene on ER from 1994 to 2000. Zima played Daisy on The Young and the Restless on and off between 2009 and 2012.

Personal life
Zima's older sisters, Madeline and Vanessa, are also actresses.

Filmography

Film

Television

Awards and nominations

Zima was nominated for a Young Artist Award for three consecutive years:

References

External links
 
 

1989 births
Living people
Actresses from New Jersey
American child actresses
American film actresses
American soap opera actresses
American people of Polish descent
People from Phillipsburg, New Jersey
20th-century American actresses
21st-century American actresses